Romania competed at the 2016 Summer Paralympics in Rio de Janeiro, Brazil, from 7 to 18 September 2016.

Disability classifications

Every participant at the Paralympics has their disability grouped into one of five disability categories; amputation, the condition may be congenital or sustained through injury or illness; cerebral palsy; wheelchair athletes, there is often overlap between this and other categories; visual impairment, including blindness; Les autres, any physical disability that does not fall strictly under one of the other categories, for example dwarfism or multiple sclerosis. Each Paralympic sport then has its own classifications, dependent upon the specific physical demands of competition. Events are given a code, made of numbers and letters, describing the type of event and classification of the athletes competing. Some sports, such as athletics, divide athletes by both the category and severity of their disabilities, other sports, for example swimming, group competitors from different categories together, the only separation being based on the severity of the disability.

Medallists

Competitors

| width=78% align=left valign=top |The following is the list of number of competitors participating in the Games.

Athletics

Romania has qualified 2 athletes for 2016 Summer Paralympics. Florentina Hrişcu is the first female athlete to qualify for Romania in athletics at the Paralympic Games.

Field Events - Women

Field Events - Men

Cycling

With one pathway for qualification being one highest ranked NPCs on the UCI Para-Cycling male and female Nations Ranking Lists on 31 December 2014, Romania qualified for the 2016 Summer Paralympics in Rio, assuming they continued to meet all other eligibility requirements. After final rankings, Romania has qualified 2 cyclists 2016 Summer Paralympics.

Road

Men

Track

Time Trial

Individual Pursuit

Judo

Romania has received an invitational spot for men extra-lightweight (60 kg) for 2016 Summer Paralympics.

Men

Paracanoeing

Romania earned a qualifying spot at the 2016 Summer Paralympics in this sport following their performance at the 2015 ICF Canoe Sprint & Paracanoe World Championships in Milan, Italy where the top six finishers in each Paralympic event earned a qualifying spot for their nation. Mihaela Lulea earned the spot for Romania after finishing fourth in the women's KL3 event. Iulian Serban earned a second spot for Romania after finishing fourth in the men's KL3 event.

Men

Women

Swimming

Men

Women

Table tennis

Men

See also
Romania at the 2016 Summer Olympics

References

Nations at the 2016 Summer Paralympics
2016
2016 in Romanian sport